Dáil Éireann, or the Dáil, may refer to:
Dáil Éireann (Irish Republic) (1919–22)
Dáil Éireann (Irish Free State) (1922–37)
Dáil Éireann (current)